The Potenza is a river in the province of Macerata in the Marche region of Italy. The source of the river is in the territory of Fiuminata. The river flows northeast through the communes of Pioraco, Castelraimondo, San Severino Marche, Macerata, Montelupone, Recanati and Potenza Picena.

References

Rivers of the Province of Macerata
Rivers of Italy